Tinglayan, officially the Municipality of Tinglayan  is a 4th class municipality in the province of Kalinga, Philippines. According to the 2020 census, it has a population of 13,148 people.

Geography

Barangays
Tinglayan is politically subdivided into 20 barangays. These barangays are headed by elected officials: Barangay Captain, Barangay Council, whose members are called Barangay Councilors. All are elected every three years.

Climate

Demographics

Economy

Government
Tinglayan, belonging to the lone congressional district of the province of Kalinga, is governed by a mayor designated as its local chief executive and by a municipal council as its legislative body in accordance with the Local Government Code. The mayor, vice mayor, and the councilors are elected directly by the people through an election which is being held every three years.

Elected officials

Tourism

Tinglayan is famous for its local celebrity, Whang-od, who is the last mambabatok (traditional tattooist).  Tourists often visit Tinglayan to see her and have their bodies tattooed.

References

External links
 [ Philippine Standard Geographic Code]
Philippine Census Information
Local Governance Performance Management System

Municipalities of Kalinga (province)
Populated places on the Rio Chico de Cagayan